Ten: The Videos is a greatest videos DVD compilation by British all-female pop group Girls Aloud. Released by Polydor Records on 26 November 2012, the release accompanied the greatest hits album Ten.  The collection is the third music video collection from Girls Aloud, following Girls on Film (2004) and Get Girls Aloud's Style (2007). The DVD features all fifteen of the music videos from the standard edition of Ten, including "Something New". All of the music videos have been previously released on DVD, with the exception of "Something New". The video album charted at number nine on the Official Charts Company's Music Video Chart on 2 December 2012.

Track listing

Chart

References

External links

2012 video albums
Girls Aloud video albums